"The Adventure of the Musgrave Ritual" is a short story by Arthur Conan Doyle, featuring his fictional detective Sherlock Holmes. The story was originally published in The Strand Magazine in the United Kingdom in May 1893, and in Harper's Weekly in the United States on 13 May 1893. It was collected in The Memoirs of Sherlock Holmes.

Unlike the majority of Holmes stories, the main narrator is not Doctor Watson, but Sherlock Holmes himself. With Watson providing an introduction, the story within a story is a classic example of a frame tale. It is one of the earliest recorded cases investigated by Holmes, and establishes his problem solving skills.

"The Adventure of the Musgrave Ritual" shares elements with two Edgar Allan Poe tales: "The Gold-Bug" and "The Cask of Amontillado".

In 1927, Conan Doyle ranked the story at 11th place on his top 12 Holmes stories list. The story did better in a 1959 chart produced by The Baker Street Journal, ranking 6th out of 10.

Plot 
In the story, Holmes recounts to Watson the events arising after a visit from a university acquaintance, Reginald Musgrave. Musgrave visits Holmes after the disappearance of two of his domestic staff, Rachel Howells, a maid, and Richard Brunton, the longtime butler. The pair vanished after Musgrave had dismissed Brunton for secretly reading a family document, the Musgrave Ritual. The Ritual, which dates from the 17th century, is a riddle set in question/response form. It reads:

Musgrave caught Brunton in the library at two o'clock one morning. Not only had he unlocked a cabinet and taken out the document in question, but he also had what looked like a chart or map, which he promptly stuffed into a pocket upon seeing his employer watching him. Brunton besought Musgrave not to dishonour him by dismissing him, and asked for a month's time to invent some reason for leaving, making it seem as though he was leaving of his own accord. Musgrave granted him a week. The story later reveals that Brunton wanted the time for something else.

A few days later, Brunton disappeared, leaving behind most of his belongings. His bed had not been slept in. No sign could be found of him. The maid, Rachel Howells, who had been Brunton's former lover until he had broken their engagement for another woman, had a hysterical fit when asked about Brunton's whereabouts, repeating over and over that he was gone. She was in such a state that another servant was posted to sit up with her at night. Eventually, however, the guarding servant nodded off one night, and the hysterical Rachel Howells escaped through a window. Her footprints led to the edge of the mere, and ended there. Musgrave had the mere dredged, but only a sack containing some rusty, mangled bits of metal, and some coloured stones or glass were found. Rachel Howells was never heard from again.

Holmes looked upon the case not as three mysteries, but as one. He considered the riddle of the ritual. It was a meaningless, absurd tradition to Musgrave, and apparently to all his ancestors going back more than two centuries, but Holmes – and Brunton, too, Holmes suspected – saw it as something very different. He quickly realized that it was a set of instructions for finding something. Ascertaining the height of the oak, which was still standing, and the position of the elm, which was now gone, Holmes performed a few calculations and paced out the route to whatever awaited him, with Musgrave now eagerly following him.

It was quite instructive to Holmes that Brunton had recently asked about the old elm tree's height as well, and that he was apparently quite intelligent.

The two men found themselves inside a doorway, momentarily disappointed, until they realized that there was the last instruction, "and so under". There was a cellar under where they were standing, as old as the house. Finding their way into it, they saw that the floor had been cleared to expose a stone slab with an iron ring on it with Brunton's muffler tied to it. Holmes thought it wise to bring the police in at this point. He and a burly Sussex policeman managed to lift the slab off the little hole that it was covering, and inside, they found an empty, rotten chest, and Brunton, who had been dead for several days. There were no marks on him. He had likely suffocated.

Holmes then put everything together for his rather shocked client. Brunton had deduced the ritual's meaning, at least insofar as it led to something valuable. He had determined the elm tree's height by asking his master, had paced out the instructions – and Holmes had later even found a peg hole in the lawn made by Brunton – had found the hiding place in the old cellar, but then had found it impossible to lift the stone slab himself. So, he had been forced to draw someone else into his treasure hunt. He had unwisely chosen Rachel Howells, who had good reason to  hate him. The two of them could have lifted the slab up, but they would have needed to support it while Brunton climbed down to fetch the treasure. Based on Rachel's sudden flight and disappearance, Holmes wondered if she had deliberately kicked the supports away and left Brunton to die, or if the slab had fallen back into place by itself and caused her to panic.

As to the relics found in the bag retrieved from the mere, Holmes examined them and found that the metal parts were gold and the stones were gems. He believed that it was no less than King Charles I’s ("His who is gone") medieval crown of St. Edward, being kept for his eventual successor – his son, Charles II ("He who will come"), who would not be crowned until 11 years after the execution of Charles I. The ritual had been a guide to retrieving this important symbol, and Reginald confirms that one of his ancestors, Sir Ralph Musgrave, was a king's man. Holmes theorized that the original holder of the ritual had died before teaching his son about its significance. It had thus become nothing more than a quaint custom for more than 200 years. One final plot twist is that the Musgraves are allowed to keep the crown fragments, although the ritual makes it clear that they were only to keep the relic ″in trust″ as it was in fact Crown property.

Publication history 
The story was originally published in the Strand Magazine in May 1893, with illustrations by Sidney Paget. It was later collected in The Memoirs of Sherlock Holmes. The Strands text of the ritual did not specify the month in which the shadow of the elm should be measured (the shadow would be longer in winter and point in different directions throughout the year), but a couplet was added for the Memoirs identifying the month as the "sixth from the first".

"The Adventure of the Musgrave Ritual" was also published in the US in Harper's Weekly on 13 May 1893, and in the US edition of The Strand Magazine in June 1893. The story was published with six illustrations by Sidney Paget in the Strand, and with two illustrations by W. H. Hyde in Harper's Weekly. It was included in  The Memoirs of Sherlock Holmes, which was published in December 1893 in the UK and February 1894 in the US.

Adaptations

Film and television

The story was adapted for the 1912 French-British Éclair film series as a silent short film.

It was also adapted as a short film as part of the Stoll film series. The film was released in 1922.

The 1943 film Sherlock Holmes Faces Death, part of the Basil Rathbone/Nigel Bruce series of films, loosely adapted the story, though the ritual was completely re-written to represent a chess game played on the floor of the Musgrave mansion. Also the treasure is a land grant that was given to the Musgraves by Henry VIII instead of the lost crown of Charles I.

The story was adapted for the 1965 BBC series Sherlock Holmes with Peter Cushing. The episode is now lost.

The story was adapted for an episode of Sherlock Holmes, the Granada Television series starring Jeremy Brett. The episode deviated from the original by including Watson in the adventure; the story nods to the framing device of the original by having Holmes, not looking forward to the trip, remark that he intends to organise some of his old cases before he met Watson in order to keep himself occupied. In addition, the story features an actual oak tree, which Holmes describes as "a patriarch among oaks, one of the most magnificent trees that I have ever seen." In the Granada film version, however, Holmes utilizes a weathervane in the shape of an oak perched on top of the Musgrave mansion to solve the mysterious ritual. At the very end of the teleplay, Rachel's body is shown to have been found after having floated up from the mere. Further, the 12th line of the ritual is adapted to suit the scenery and the 5th and 6th lines are omitted. It was filmed in the 400-year-old Baddesley Clinton Manor House near Birmingham, UK. This house was the Musgrave home in the TV episode. In the original story, this was one of Holmes early cases just after he had graduated from college; in the adaptation, the time sequence is moved to when Holmes had partnered with Watson to solve mysteries.

An episode of the animated television series Sherlock Holmes in the 22nd Century was based on the story. The episode, titled "The Musgrave Ritual", first aired in 1999.

Episodes 9 and 10 of the 2013 Russian TV series Sherlock Holmes are based on the story, although the storyline is quite different including some action scenes and Brunton being in fact a revenging member of a family of Musgraves' rivals.

The Musgrave Ritual is adapted as part of the storyline of the final episode of the fourth season of Sherlock, "The Final Problem"; as children, the Holmes family lived in an old house called Musgrave, but after Sherlock and Mycroft's sister Eurus was involved in the disappearance of Sherlock's dog/best friend (Sherlock had for years believed it was a dog as he buried the memory due to the scale of the mental trauma), all Eurus would provide as a clue was a strange song. Years later, with John Watson's life at stake as he is trapped in the same location where Eurus left her first victim, Sherlock deduces that the song relates to the unusual dates on various fake gravestones around the house, the resulting 'code' leading him to Eurus' old room to make an emotional appeal to his sister to spare John.

Radio
Edith Meiser adapted the story as an episode of the American radio series The Adventures of Sherlock Holmes which aired on 5 January 1931, with Richard Gordon as Sherlock Holmes and Leigh Lovell as Dr. Watson.

The story was adapted for the American radio series The New Adventures of Sherlock Holmes with Basil Rathbone as Holmes and Nigel Bruce as Watson. The episode aired on 16 July 1943.

A 1962 BBC Light Programme radio adaptation aired as part of the 1952–1969 radio series starring Carleton Hobbs as Holmes and Norman Shelley as Watson.

An adaptation aired on BBC radio in June 1978, starring Barry Foster as Holmes and David Buck as Watson. It was adapted by Michael Bakewell.

"The Musgrave Ritual" was adapted as a 1981 episode of the series CBS Radio Mystery Theater with Gordon Gould as Sherlock Holmes and Court Benson as Dr. Watson.

"The Musgrave Ritual" was dramatised by Peter Mackie for BBC Radio 4 in 1992 as part of the 1989–1998 radio series starring Clive Merrison as Holmes and Michael Williams as Watson. It featured Robert Daws as Reginald Musgrave and Michael Kilgarriff as Sergeant Harris.

A 2014 episode of The Classic Adventures of Sherlock Holmes, a series on the American radio show Imagination Theatre, was adapted from the story, with John Patrick Lowrie as Holmes and Lawrence Albert as Watson.

Stage
T. S. Eliot stated that he adapted part of the Ritual in his 1935 verse play Murder in the Cathedral as a deliberate homage.

References
Notes

Sources

External links 

 
 

Musgrave Ritual, The Adventure of the
1893 short stories
English Civil War fiction
Works originally published in The Strand Magazine
Works originally published in Harper's Weekly